Dejan Verčič is a communication researcher and public relations theorist.

Dejan Verčič is Professor, Head of Department of Communication and Head of Centre for Marketing and Public Relations at the Faculty of Social Sciences of the University of Ljubljana (Slovenia), and Partner and Knowledge Director in strategic communication group Stratkom d.o.o., Slovenia.

Biography
Verčič received his PhD from the London School of Economics and Political Science, UK, and he was a Fulbright scholar at the San Diego State University, USA. Dr. Verčič has published 14 books and his most recent are Experiencing public relations (2018), Communication Excellence (2017), Culture and Public Relations (2012) and The Global Public Relations Handbook (2009). In 2001 he was awarded the Alan Campbell-Johnson Medal for outstanding service to international public relations by the UK Chartered Institute of Public Relations (of which he is a Fellow), and in 2016 the Pathfinder Award, the highest academic honour bestowed by the Institute for Public Relations (IPR) in New York. In 2015 he was elected an Honorary Member of the Croatian Public Relations Association, and in 2016 into Arthur Page Society. Verčič served, inter alia, as the chairman of the Research Committee of the IABC Research Foundation and as the President of the European Public Relations Education and Research Association (EUPRERA). In 1991 he was the founding director of Slovenian national news agency (STA). Since 1994, he organizes an annual International Public Relations Research Symposium – BledCom and since 2007 he is a founding member of the European Communication Monitor (ECM) research team.

Dr. Verčič is a regular speaker at universities, academic and professional meetings around the world. So far, he has lectured in 37 countries (Austria, Belgium, Bosnia and Herzegovina, Bulgaria, Canada, China, Croatia, Cyprus, Czechia, Denmark, Egypt, Estonia, Finland, France, Germany, Greece, Hungary, Italy, Mexico, Netherlands, Norway, Peru, Poland, Portugal, Rumania, Russia, Serbia, Singapore, Slovakia, Spain, Sweden, Switzerland, South Korea, Turkey, UK and USA).

Publications
 Hallahan, K., Holtzhausen, D, van Ruler, B., Verčič, D., Sriramesh, K. (2007).  Defining strategic communication. International Journal of Strategic Communication 1(1): 3-35.
 van Ruler, B., Tkalac Verčič, A., Verčič, D., (Eds.) (2008). Public relations metrics: Research and evaluation. London/New York: Routledge.
 van Ruler, B., Verčič, D. (2002). The Bled Manifesto on public relations and communication management. Ljubljana: Pristop.
 van Ruler, B., Verčič, D. (Eds.) (2004). Public relations and communication management in Europe: A nation-by-nation introduction to public relations theory and practice. Berlin/New York: Mouton de Gruyter.
Verhoeven, P., Tench, R., Zerfass, A., Moreno, A., & Verčič, D. (2014) Crisis? What crisis? How European professionals handle crises and crisis communication. Public relations review 40(1), 107-109.
Tkalac Verčič, A., & Verčič, D. (2013) Digital natives and social media. Public relations review 39(5), 600-602.
 van Ruler, B., Verčič, D. (2005). Reflective communication management, future ways of public relations research. In: Kalbfleisch, P. J., (Ed.) Communication Yearbook 29 (pp. 239–273). Mahwah, NJ: Lawrence Erlbaum Associates.
 van Ruler, B., Verčič, D., Bütschi, G., Flodin, B. (2004). A first look for parameters of public relations in Europe. Journal of public relations research 16(1): 35-63.
 van Ruler, B., Verčič, D., Flodin, B., Bütschi, G. (2004). Public relations in Europe: a kaleidoscopic picture. Journal of communication management 6(2): 166-175.
 Sriramesh, K., Verčič, D. (2001). International public relations: a framework for future research. Journal of communication management 6(2): 103-117.
 Sriramesh, K., Verčič, D. (Eds.) (2009). The Global public relations handbook: Theory, research, and practice. Rev. and expanded ed. London/New York: Routledge.
 Sriramesh, K., Verčič, D. (2012). Culture and public relations: links and implications. London/New York: Routledge.
 Tkalac Verčič, A., Verčič, D., Sriramesh, K. (2012). Internal communication: Definition, parameters, and the future. Public relations review 38(2): 223-230.
 Verčič, D. (2000). The European public relations body of knowledge. Journal of communication management 4(4): 341-351.
 Verčič, D., Ruler, B. van, Bütschi, G., Flodin, B. (2000). On the definition of public relations: A European view. Public relations review 27(4): 373-387.
E. Bridgen & D. Verčič, ur. (2018) Experiencing public relations: International voices.London: Routledge.
R. Tench, D. Verčič, A. Zerfass, A. Moreno in P. Verhoeven, ur. (2017) Communication Excellence: How to develop, manage and lead exceptional communicatuions. Cham: Palgrave Macmillan.
K. Sriramesh & D. Verčič, ur. (2012). Culture and public relations: Links and implications. London/New York: Routledge.
K. Sriramesh & D. Verčič, ur. (2009). The global public relations handbook: Theory, research, and practice, rev. and expanded ed. New York/London: Routledge.
B. van Ruler, A. Tkalac Verčič & D. Verčič, ur. (2008). Public relations metrics: Research and evaluation. New York/London: Routledge.
B. van Ruler & D. Verčič, ur. (2004). Public relations and communication management in Europe: A nation-by-nation introduction to public relations theory and practice.Berlin: Mouton de Gruyter.
D. Moss, D. Verčič & G. Warnaby, ur. (2003). Perspectives on public relations research.London/New York: Routledge.
B. Newman & D. Verčič, ur. (2003). Communication of politics: Cross-cultural theory building in practice of public relations and political marketing.Haworth Press.

References

External links
 P4ACE
 BledCom
 European Communication Monitor
 The Bled Manifesto on Public Relations
 Public Relations: Contributions from Ljubljana

1963 births
Living people
Alumni of the London School of Economics
Academic staff of the University of Ljubljana
Academic staff of the University of Zagreb